Kagwad is one of the 224 constituencies in the Karnataka Legislative Assembly of Karnataka a south state of India. Kagwad is also part of Chikkodi Lok Sabha constituency.

Election Results

2018 assembly elections

Members of Legislative Assembly

Mysore State
 1962: Shankaragaud Veeranagoud Patil, Indian National Congress
 1967: B. C. Peeraji, Indian National Congress
 1972: Ragunath Dhulappa Kittur, Indian National Congress

Karnataka State
 1978: Annarao Balappa Jakanur, Indian National Congress (Indira)
 1983: V. L. Patil, Janata Party
 1985: V. L. Patil, Janata Party
 1989: Annarao Balappa Jakanur, Indian National Congress
 1994: Shaha Mohan Hirachand, Janata Dal
 1999: Pasagouda Urf Popat Appagoda Patil, Indian National Congress
 2000 (By-Polls): Bharamgouda Alagouda Kage (Raju Kage), Janata Dal (United)
 2004: Bharamgouda Alagouda Kage (Raju Kage), Bharatiya Janata Party
 2008: Bharamgouda Alagouda Kage (Raju Kage), Bharatiya Janata Party
 2013: Bharamgouda Alagouda Kage (Raju Kage), Bharatiya Janata Party
 2018: Shrimant Balasaheb Patil, Indian National Congress
 2019 (By-Polls): Shrimant Balasaheb Patil, Bharatiya Janata Party

See also
 Athani Taluk
 Belagavi district
 Chikkodi Lok Sabha constituency
 List of constituencies of Karnataka Legislative Assembly

References

 

Assembly constituencies of Karnataka
Belagavi district